The 2019 Monterrey Challenger was a professional tennis tournament played on hard courts. It was the tenth edition of the tournament which was part of the 2019 ATP Challenger Tour. It took place in Monterrey, Mexico from 1 to 7 April 2019.

Singles main-draw entrants

Seeds

 1 Rankings are as of 18 March 2019.

Other entrants
The following players received wildcards into the singles main draw:
  Lucas Gómez
  Nicolás Mejía
  Emilio Nava
  Manuel Sánchez
  Janko Tipsarević

The following player received entry into the singles main draw using a protected ranking:
  Michał Przysiężny

The following players received entry from the qualifying draw:
  Matías Franco Descotte
  Kevin King

The following player received entry as a lucky loser:
  Luis Patiño

Champions

Singles

  Alexander Bublik def.  Emilio Gómez 6–3, 6–2.

Doubles

  Evan King /  Nathan Pasha def.  Santiago González /  Aisam-ul-Haq Qureshi 7–5, 6–2.

References

2019 in Mexican sports
2019 ATP Challenger Tour
April 2019 sports events in Mexico